James Henry (born 7 July 1975) is a Scottish former football midfielder.

Henry began his career with Montrose. He spent a season and a half at Links Park, before dropping down to the
junior leagues with Lochee United. He returned to senior football in the summer of 2000, signing for Clyde. Henry never cemented his place as a first team regular at Clyde, and joined Stenhousemuir in March 2001. He went on to play for Forfar Athletic and Raith Rovers before returning to the juniors.

External links

Living people
1975 births
Scottish footballers
Montrose F.C. players
Clyde F.C. players
Stenhousemuir F.C. players
Forfar Athletic F.C. players
Raith Rovers F.C. players
Scottish Football League players
Footballers from Dundee
Association football midfielders
Carnoustie Panmure F.C. players
Lochee United F.C. players
Tayport F.C. players